Terry House may refer to:

William L. Terry House, Little Rock, Arkansas, listed on the National Register of Historic Places (NRHP) in Pulaski County
Pike–Fletcher–Terry House, Little Rock, Arkansas, NRHP-listed in Pulaski County
Terry-Hayden House, Bristol, Connecticut, NRHP-listed in Hartford County
Isham-Terry House, Hartford, Connecticut, NRHP-listed in Hartford County
Terry House (Rochester Hills, Michigan), one of Michigan State Historic Sites in Oakland County
Terry-Ketcham Inn, Center Moriches, New York, NRHP-listed in Suffolk County
Terry-Mulford House, Orient, New York, NRHP-listed in Suffolk County
A. P. Terry House, Pittsboro, North Carolina, NRHP-listed in Chatham County
Terry House (Poteau, Oklahoma), NRHP-listed in Oklahoma County
Carter–Terry–Call House, Orem, Utah, NRHP-listed in Utah County

See also
Terry Hall (disambiguation)
Terry Block Building, Bentonville, Arkansas, listed on the National Register of Historic Places (NRHP) in Benton County
Terry's Plain Historic District, Simsbury, Connecticut, NRHP-listed in Hartford County
Terry Park Ballfield, Fort Myers, Florida, NRHP-listed in Lee County